This is a list of New Zealand radio personalities, including presenters and journalists.

A
 Aunt Daisy – ZB presenter

B
 Petra Bagust – Newstalk ZB presenter
 Simon Barnett – Newstalk ZB presenter
 Hilary Barry – former Radio Live newsreader
 Maggie Barry – former Radio Live and Radio New Zealand National presenter
 Kevin Black – former Solid Gold and Radio Hauraki presenter
 Ben Boyce – The Edge, former The Rock presenter
 Greg Boyed – former Newstalk ZB presenter
 Sarah Bradley – former Radio Live newsreader
 Pat Brittenden – radio presenter
 Clint Brown –  former Radio Sport presenter

C
 John Campbell – former Checkpoint presenter
 Suzy Cato – Access Radio Network presenter
 Sharyn Casey – The Edge presenter
 Wallace Chapman – Radio New Zealand National presenter
 Lana Coc-Kroft – former radio presenter
 James Coleman – Radio Live and The Sound presenter
 Pam Corkery – former Newstalk ZB presenter
 Joe Cotton – More FM presenter
 Bryan Crump – Radio New Zealand National presenter
 Max Cryer – former Radio Live contributor

D
 Simon Dallow – former Easy Mix presenter
 Martin Devlin – Radio Sport presenter
 Oliver Driver – former Newstalk ZB presenter

E
 Brian Edwards – radio contributor

F
 Andrew Fagan – Radio Live presenter
 Carly Flynn – former Radio Live presenter
 Jay-Jay Feeney - More FM presenter
 Mihingarangi Forbes – Radio New Zealand broadcaster
 Derek Fox – radio presenter
 Ian Fraser – radio presenter

G
 Iain Gallaway – Radio Sport sports commentator
 Duncan Garner – Magic Talk AM Show presenter
 Clarke Gayford – former The Edge, Channel Z, More FM, and George FM presenter
 Polly Gillespie – More FM Wellington presenter

H
 Mikey Havoc – Radio Hauraki presenter
 John Hawkesby – Newstalk ZB contributor
 Kate Hawkesby – Newstalk ZB host
 Dom Harvey – The Edge Breakfast Presenter
 Karyn Hay – Radio New Zealand presenter
 Samantha Hayes – Magic Talk presenter
 Matt Heath - Radio Hauraki presenter
 Paul Henry – former Radio Live presenter
 Dai Henwood – former George FM presenter
 Mark Hewlett – former ZM presenter
 Kim Hill – Radio New Zealand presenter
 Paul Holmes – former Newstalk ZB presenter
 Alison Holst – Radio New Zealand contributor
 Jim Hopkins – radio presenter
 Mike Hosking – Newstalk ZB presenter
 Brooke Howard-Smith – former The Edge presenter

J
 Willie Jackson – Radio Live presenter

K
 Grant Kereama – The Hits presenter
 Ruud Kleinpaste – Newstalk ZB contributor

 Michael Laws – former Radio Live radio personality
 Bob Leahy – radio presenter
 Mark Leishman – The Breeze presenter
 Phillip Leishman – radio presenter
 Zane Lowe – Apple Music 1 DJ, former BBC Radio One presenter
 Marcus Lush – Newstalk ZB presenter

M

 Toni Marsh – radio newsreader
 Paul Martin – radio presenter
 Gary McCormick – More FM presenter
 Hamish McKay – Magic Talk presenter
 Kevin Milne – Newstalk ZB contributor
 Peter Montgomery – Radio Sport commentator
 Jim Mora – Radio New Zealand presenter
 Stacey Morrison – The Hits presenter
 Lesley Murdoch – Newstalk ZB presenter, sports commentator

O
 Margaret Kathleen O'Brien – radio presenter
 Bernadine Oliver-Kerby – Newstalk ZB newsreader

P
 Steve Parr – radio presenter
 Leah Panapa - former Radio Hauraki (New Zealand), former The Rock - Today FM Host
 Lindsay Perigo – Radio Live presenter
 Brian Perkins – BBC Radio 4 newsreader
 Jono Pryor – The Edge, former The Rock presenter
 Mike Puru – former The Edge presenter

Q
 Keith Quinn – former Radio New Zealand sports commentator

R
 Bill Ralston – radio presenter
Clinton Randell – The Edge Breakfast Presenter
Clint Roberts – ZM, former The Edge and George FM presenter
Jason Reeves – Coast Breakfast
 Mark Richardson – Magic Talk AM Show presenter

S
 Mark Sainsbury – former Radio Live presenter
Ric Scarrold - former Commercial Radio Presenter, Royal Tour Commentator, Compere of Skellerup Young Farmer of the Year, Mobil Radio Awards Judge
 Simon Shepherd – former Radio Live presenter
 Haydn Sherley – radio presenter
 Slave & Otis – radio presenters
 Kerry Smith – former The Breeze (New Zealand) and Radio Live presenter
 Leighton Smith – former Newstalk ZB presenter
 Barry Soper – Newstalk ZB reporter
 Iain Stables – radio personality
 Percy Ronald Stevens – radio presenter
 Toni Street – Coast Breakfast

T
 John Tamihere – former Radio Live presenter
 Selwyn Toogood – radio presenter

V
 Tony Veitch –  former Newstalk ZB presenter

W
 Bryan Waddle – Radio Sport sports commentator
 Arnold Wall – radio presenter
 Jeremy Wells – Radio Hauraki presenter
 Guy Williams – former The Edge presenter
 Peter Williams – Magic Talk Mornings host, former 1 News anchor
 Susan Wood – Newstalk ZB presenter

Y
 Lindsay Yeo – radio presenter
 Eric Young – Magic Talk presenter, newsreader

References

Radio personalities